Pétaka  is a village and rural commune in the Cercle of Douentza in the Mopti Region of Mali. The commune contains five villages and had a population of 6,010 in the 2009 census.

References

External links
.
.

Communes of Mopti Region